The 1983 Atlantic hurricane season  was an event in the annual tropical cyclone season in the north Atlantic Ocean. It was the least active Atlantic hurricane season in 53 years, during which four storms formed. The season officially began on June 1, 1983 and ended November 30, 1983. These dates, adopted by convention, historically describe the period in each year when most systems form. The first named storm, Hurricane Alicia, formed on August 15. The last storm of the season, Tropical Storm Dean, dissipated on September 30.

This season produced seven tropical depressions, of which four became named storms; three attained hurricane status, of which one became a major hurricane, a storm that ranks as a Category 3 or higher on the Saffir–Simpson scale. The most notable storm in 1983 was Hurricane Alicia, which killed 21 people and caused $2.6 billion (1983 USD; $5.6 billion 2008 USD) in damages, making it the costliest storm, at the time, in Texas history. As a result of its intensity, the name Alicia was subsequently retired from reuse in the North Atlantic by the World Meteorological Organization. Another notable storm, Hurricane Barry, made landfall on Florida as a tropical storm, then, after crossing into the Gulf of Mexico crossing, strengthened into a weak Category 1 hurricane that traveled almost due west across the Gulf before making landfall in extreme northern Mexico.

This timeline documents tropical cyclone formations, strengthening, weakening, landfalls, extratropical transitions, and dissipations during the season. It includes information that was not released throughout the season, meaning that data from post-storm reviews by the National Hurricane Center, such as a storm that was not initially warned upon, has been included.

By convention, meteorologists one time zone when issuing forecasts and making observations: Coordinated Universal Time (UTC), and also use the 24-hour clock (where 00:00 = midnight UTC). In this time line, all information is listed by UTC first with the respective local time included in parentheses.

Timeline

June
June 1
The Atlantic hurricane season officially begins.

July
July 23

8 a.m. AST (1200 UTC) – Tropical Depression One forms 955 miles (1,540 km) southwest of Brava, Cape Verde.
July 27
8 a.m.
8 a.m. AST (1200 UTC) – Tropical Depression Two forms 245 miles (395 km) southwest of Brava, Cape Verde.
July 28
2 p.m. AST (1800 UTC) – Tropical Depression One dissipates over the open waters of the Caribbean.

August
August 2
8 a.m. AST (1200 UTC) – Tropical Depression Two dissipates over open waters.
August 15
7 a.m. CDT (1200 UTC) – Tropical Depression  Three forms 185 miles (295 km) south-southwest of New Orleans, Louisiana.
1 p.m. CDT (1800 UTC) – Tropical Depression Three strengthens into Tropical Storm Alicia.
August 16
7 p.m. CDT (0000 UTC August 17) – Tropical Storm Alicia intensifies into a hurricane.
August 17
1 p.m. CDT (1800 UTC) – Hurricane Alicia strengthens into a Category 2 hurricane.
August 18

1 a.m.
3 a.m.
7 a.m. CDT (1200 UTC) – Hurricane Alicia weakens to a Category 1 hurricane.
1 p.m. CDT (1800 UTC) – Hurricane Alicia weakens to a tropical storm.
August 19
1 a.m. CDT (0600 UTC) – Tropical Storm Alicia weakens to a tropical depression.
August 20
1 a.m. CDT (0600 UTC) – Tropical Depression Alicia transitions into an extratropical cyclone while located over Nebraska.
August 23
2 p.m. EDT (1800 UTC) – Tropical Depression Four forms 105 miles (175 km) northeast of Nassau, Bahamas.
August 24
2 a.m. EDT (0600 UTC) – Tropical Depression Four strengthens into Tropical Storm Barry.
August 25
7 a.m.
August 26

2 a.m. EDT (0600 UTC) – Tropical Depression Barry emerges into the Gulf of Mexico.
August 27
7 a.m. CDT (1200 UTC) – Tropical Depression Barry re-intensifies into a tropical storm.
August 28
7 a.m. CDT (1200 UTC) – Tropical Storm Barry strengthens into a hurricane.
7 p.m. CDT (0000 UTC August 29) – Hurricane Barry weakens to a tropical storm.
August 29
1 a.m. CDT (0600 UTC) – Tropical Storm Barry weakens to a tropical depression.
1 p.m. CDT (1800 UTC) – Tropical Depression Barry dissipates over Mexico.

September
September 10
8 a.m. AST (1200 UTC) – Tropical Depression Five forms 145 miles (235 km) south-southeast of Bermuda.
8 p.m. AST (0000 UTC September 11) – Tropical Depression Five strengthens into Tropical Storm Chantal.
September 11

2 p.m. AST (1800 UTC) – Tropical Storm Chantal intensifies into a hurricane.
September 12
8 p.m. AST (0000 UTC September 13) – Hurricane Chantal weakens to a tropical storm.
September 14
8 p.m. AST (0000 UTC September 15) – Tropical Storm Chantal weakens to a tropical depression.
September 15
8 a.m. AST (1200 UTC) – Tropical Depression Chantal dissipates over open waters.
September 19
exact time unknown – Tropical Depression Six forms near the Lesser Antilles.
September 21
exact time unknown – Tropical Depression Six degenerates into a tropical wave over the Dominican Republic.
September 26

2 p.m. EDT (1800 UTC) – Subtropical Storm One forms 335 miles (540 km) northeast of Nassau, Bahamas.
September 27
2 p.m. EDT (1800 UTC) – Subtropical Storm One transitions into a tropical cyclone and is given the name Dean.
September 30
8 a.m.
2 p.m. EDT (1800 UTC) – Tropical Storm Dean weakens to a tropical depression.
8 p.m. EDT (0000 UTC October 1) – Tropical Depression Dean dissipates over Virginia.

October
No tropical cyclones formed during the month of October.

November
November 30
The Atlantic hurricane season officially ends.

See also

Lists of Atlantic hurricanes

Notes

References

External links
 nhc.noaa.gov, National Hurricane Center homepage

 Timeline
1983 meteorology
1983 Atlantic hurricane season
Articles which contain graphical timelines
1983 ATL T